Amy Gledhill is a British stand-up comedian. She has been nominated for Best Show at the UK National Comedy Awards and Best Show and Best Newcomer at the Edinburgh Fringe Festival.

Early life
As part of her stand-up routine Gledhill has said she’s from Hull and is the youngest of seven children.

Career

2018
In 2018 it was announced on the BBC One programme The One Show that Gledhill was the second winner of the Caroline Aherne Bursary. She received a cash prize and mentoring from a BBC commissioning editor.

2019
As part of the comedy sketch double act The Delightful Sausage, with Chris Cantril, Gledhill was nominated for Best Show at the Edinburgh Fringe Festival’s Comedy Awards for their show Ginsters Paradise.

2021
In 2021 Gledhill appeared as Leslie in the BBC Two and BBC iPlayer comedy series Alma's Not Normal.

2022
At the 2022 Edinburgh Fringe Festival made her solo show debut. Gledhill was nominated for Best Newcomer for her solo show The Girl Before The Girl You Marry in the Edinburgh Comedy Awards. She was also nominated for Best Show as part of her duo The Delightful Sausage. She was the first person to be nominated for involvement in two shows in the same year since Dan Antopolski in 2000.

2023
In 2023 Gledhill embarked on her first solo UK tour. This came after a sold-out run at the Soho Theatre in London. In January 2023 she hosted the BBC Sounds podcast ’Obsessed with…Happy Valley’, alongside fellow comedian Issy Suttie in which they would discuss “fan theories and chat to familiar faces from the cast”. In February 2023 Gledhill was nominated at the UK National Comedy Awards in the Best Stand-Up category for her show The Girl Before The Girl You Marry.

Personal life
Gledhill lived in Leeds and Manchester before moving to London.

References

Living people
Comedians from Yorkshire
English stand-up comedians
English women comedians
People from Kingston upon Hull
Year of birth missing (living people)